Strike Fighter Squadron 122 (VFA-122), also known as the "Flying Eagles", are a United States Navy F/A-18E/F Super Hornet and F/A-18 Hornet Fleet Replacement Squadron stationed at Naval Air Station Lemoore.

History
There have been two distinct Navy squadrons known as the "Flying Eagles". The first was established in 1950 as VC-35, later redesignated VA(AW)-35, and then VA-122 and was disestablished in May 1991. Often, the new squadron will assume the nickname, insignia, and traditions of the earlier squadrons, but officially, the US Navy does not recognize a direct lineage with decommissioned squadrons if a new squadron is formed with the same designation.

In January 1999 a new Flying Eagles squadron was established as Strike Fighter Squadron 122 (VFA-122), the first squadron to operate the F/A-18E/F Super Hornet.

On 1 October 2010 VFA-125 (the "legacy" F/A-18 Hornet FRS also stationed at NAS Lemoore) was deactivated and the squadron's aircraft and personnel were absorbed into VFA-122. The merger was intended to cut administrative costs and streamline production in anticipation of the "legacy" F/A-18 Hornet being phased out by the Super Hornet and F-35 Lightning II in the coming years. The merged squadron retained the Flying Eagles insignia and the Rough Raiders of VFA-125 were deactivated.

Mission

As the West Coast Hornet and Super Hornet Fleet Replacement Squadron, the squadron's mission is to train Navy and Marine Corps F/A-18A/B/C/D/E/F Replacement Pilots and Weapon Systems Officers (WSOs) to support fleet commitments. Every 6 weeks a class of between 8–12 newly winged Navy pilots and Naval Flight Officers begins the 9-month training course in which they learn the basics of air-to-air and air-to-ground missions, culminating in day/night carrier qualification and subsequent assignment to fleet Hornet squadrons.

VFA-122's East Coast counterpart is VFA-106 at NAS Oceana. Aircrew returning from non-flying assignments undergo refresher training at VFA-122 prior to returning to the fleet. Additionally, VFA-122 (with the help from the Center of Naval Aviation Technical Training Unit: CNATTTU) trains maintenance personnel and provides replacement aircraft to fleet units.

VFA-122 currently has approximately 225 officers, 408 enlisted personnel and operates over 60 aircraft. The squadron often detaches aircraft to Naval Air Station Fallon, Nevada and Naval Air Facility El Centro, California, as well as various aircraft carriers for carrier qualifications (CQ).

Significant mishaps
On 6 April 2011, squadron pilot Matthew I. Lowe, 33, and weapons systems officer Nathan H. Williams, 26, were killed when their F/A-18 crashed half a mile from NAS Lemoore on a routine training mission.

Trivia
In 2011, in honor of the Centennial of Naval Aviation, the F/A18F Super Hornet BuNo 165677 was painted in a unique "digital camo" look.

References

External links
 VFA-122 Flying Eagles Home Page
 VFA-122 Make the Grade - Naval Aviation News (July–August 2003)
 F/A-18F 165677/NJ-100 VFA-122 - NAS North Island, 100 Years of Naval Aviation

See also
Naval aviation
Modern US Navy carrier air operations
United States Marine Corps Aviation
List of United States Navy aircraft squadrons
List of Inactive United States Navy aircraft squadrons

Strike fighter squadrons of the United States Navy
Military units and formations in California